Doland is a city in eastern Spink County, South Dakota, United States. The population was 199 at the 2020 census.

History
Doland was platted in 1882. The city was named for F. H. Doland, an original owner of the town site. A post office has been in operation in Doland since 1882.

Geography
Doland is located at  (44.894083, -98.100817).

Doland has been assigned the ZIP code 57436 and the FIPS place code 16820.

Demographics

2010 census
As of the census of 2010, there were 180 people, 95 households, and 47 families residing in the city. The racial makeup of the city was 98.9% White, 0.6% Native American, and 0.6% from two or more races. Hispanic or Latino of any race were 1.7% of the population.

There were 95 households, of which 14.7% had children under the age of 18 living with them, 40.0% were married couples living together, 5.3% had a female householder with no husband present, 4.2% had a male householder with no wife present, and 50.5% were non-families. 46.3% of all households were made up of individuals, and 17.9% had someone living alone who was 65 years of age or older. The average household size was 1.89 and the average family size was 2.68.

The median age in the city was 50.2 years. 15.6% of residents were under the age of 18; 7.7% were between the ages of 18 and 24; 15% were from 25 to 44; 42.8% were from 45 to 64; and 18.9% were 65 years of age or older. The gender makeup of the city was 47.2% male and 52.8% female.

2000 census
As of the census of 2000, there were 297 people, 120 households, and 75 families residing in the city. The population density was 504.0 people per square mile (194.4/km2). There were 159 housing units at an average density of 269.8 per square mile (104.1/km2). The racial makeup of the city was 96.97% White, 0.67% African American, 1.35% Native American, 0.34% from other races, and 0.67% from two or more races. Hispanic or Latino of any race were 0.67% of the population.

There were 120 households, out of which 33.3% had children under the age of 18 living with them, 55.0% were married couples living together, 5.0% had a female householder with no husband present, and 36.7% were non-families. 34.2% of all households were made up of individuals, and 19.2% had someone living alone who was 65 years of age or older. The average household size was 2.48 and the average family size was 3.22.

In the city, the population was spread out, with 30.3% under the age of 18, 5.7% from 18 to 24, 29.0% from 25 to 44, 20.2% from 45 to 64, and 14.8% who were 65 years of age or older. The median age was 37 years. For every 100 females, there were 95.4 males. For every 100 females age 18 and over, there were 97.1 males.

The median income for a household in the city was $30,313, and the median income for a family was $35,625. Males had a median income of $24,375 versus $20,357 for females. The per capita income for the city was $17,437. About 20.3% of families and 19.9% of the population were below the poverty line, including 28.4% of those under the age of eighteen and 14.3% of those 65 or over.

Notable people
 Doland was the hometown of Hubert Humphrey, who served as a U.S. Senator from Minnesota from 1949 to 1965 and 1971 to 1978. Humphrey was the Vice President of the United States from 1965 to 1969. He was the Democratic Party's 1968 candidate for President; he lost narrowly to Republican Richard Nixon. Humphrey's father ran a pharmacy in Doland from 1915 to 1929, and served as the town's mayor for several years.
 Harvey L. Wollman, 26th Governor of South Dakota
 Roger Leland Wollman, Chief Justice of the Supreme Court of South Dakota and Judge of the United States Court of Appeals for the Eighth Circuit
 Tim Miles, basketball coach, San Jose State University
 Jon Madsen, professional Mixed Martial Artist, formerly with the UFC compiling a record of 4–1.
 Air Force Lieutenant General Marvin L. McNickle (b 1914, d. 2007) was born in Doland and was a 1932 Doland High School graduate. His twin brother was also an Air Force General.
 Air Force Major General Melvin F. McNickle (b 1914, d. 1986) was born in Doland and was a 1932 Doland High School graduate.  His twin brother was also an Air Force General.
 Chris Divich, Air Force Major General
 Dennis Koslowski, 1992 Olympic silver medalist in Greco-Roman wrestling,  1988 Olympic bronze medalist, 100 kg, is a 1977 Doland High School graduate and the twin brother of Olympian Duane Koslowski.
 Duane Koslowski, 1988 Olympic Greco-Roman wrestler, 130 kg, is a 1977 Doland High School graduate and the twin brother of Olympian Dennis Koslowski.
Army Lieutenant General Marvin Fuller, former Doland High School coach.

See also
 List of cities in South Dakota

References

External links

Cities in South Dakota
Cities in Spink County, South Dakota
Populated places established in 1882
1882 establishments in Dakota Territory